Antimima is a genus of moths in the family Notodontidae. It was first described by Alfred Jefferis Turner in 1917. Its type species is Antimima cryptica. Species from the genus are found in Australia.

Species 
There are two species in the genus:

 A. cryptica Turner, 1917
 A. corystes Turner, 1931

References 

Notodontidae
Moths described in 1917
Taxa named by Alfred Jefferis Turner
Moths of Australia